Mykhailo Hurka (born November 21, 1975) is a Ukrainian former footballer and manager.

Playing career 
Hurka began his career in 1993 with FC Karpaty Lviv, and midway through the season he was transferred to FC LAZ Lviv in the Ukrainian Second League. In his debut season with FC LAZ he helped the club achieve a promotion to the Ukrainian First League, but the following season remained in the Ukrainian Second League with FC Halychyna Drohobych. In 1995, he played in his country's top tier league the Ukrainian Premier League with his former club Karpaty Lviv. Following a short stint in the Ukrainian First League with FC Lviv he returned to the Premier League in 1997 to play with FC Vorskla Poltava, and Karpaty Lviv. In 2002, he signed with FC Hoverla Uzhhorod and won the league title and a promotion to the Premier League in 2003.

The remainder of his career was spent in the Ukrainian Second League with Obolon Kyiv, FC Volyn Lutsk, Desna Chernihiv, Nyva Ternopil, and played in the Ukrainian Amateur League with SC Beregvidek Berehove in 2010. In 2016, he played abroad with FC Ukraine United in the Canadian Soccer League. In his second season he assisted FC Ukraine in achieving a perfect season, and winning the Second Division Championship. While in his third year he assisted in securing the First Division title.

Managerial career 
In 2017, he joined the managerial staff as an assistant coach for Andrei Malychenkov, while still performing as an active player. In 2019, he became the head coach for Ukraine United, and in his debut season in charge led the team to the CSL Championship final against Scarborough SC, but in a losing effort.

Honors

FC Hoverla Uzhhorod 
 Ukrainian First League: 2003-2004

FC Ukraine United 
 CSL Second Division Championship: 2017
 Canadian Soccer League First Division: 2018

References 

1975 births
Living people
Sportspeople from Lviv
Ukrainian footballers
Ukrainian football managers
SC Skify Lviv players
FC Karpaty Lviv players
FC Halychyna Drohobych players
FC Lviv (1992) players
FC Vorskla Poltava players
FC Vorskla-2 Poltava players
FC Karpaty-2 Lviv players
FC Karpaty-3 Lviv players
FC Hoverla Uzhhorod players
FC Obolon-Brovar Kyiv players
FC Volyn Lutsk players
FC Desna Chernihiv players
FC Nyva Ternopil players
FC Ukraine United players
Ukrainian Premier League players
Canadian Soccer League (1998–present) players
Association football defenders
Ukrainian First League players
Canadian Soccer League (1998–present) managers
Ukrainian Second League players